Diphaglossinae is a subfamily of bees in the family Colletidae. There are 9 genera and more than 130 described species in Diphaglossinae.

Genera
 Cadeguala Reed, 1892
 Cadegualina Michener, 1986
 Caupolicana Spinola, 1851
 Crawfordapis Moure, 1964
 Diphaglossa Spinola, 1851
 Mydrosoma Smith, 1879
 Mydrosomella Michener, 1986
 Ptiloglossa Smith, 1853
 Ptiloglossidia Moure, 1953

References

Further reading

External links

Colletidae
Articles created by Qbugbot